S.S. Jolley Bridge (also known as Judge S.S. Jolley Bridge) is a bridge located in Collier County, Florida connecting Marco Island with the mainland in Naples. The bridge is a good location for fishing.

The Jolley Bridge opened in 1969 and was the second vehicular bridge connecting to Marco Island.  The first was the original span of the Goodland Bridge built in 1938.  In 2011, a second parallel span was built next to the original to provide two additional travel lanes.  Today, southbound traffic uses the newer span, and northbound traffic uses the original span.

The Jolley Bridge is named for former Collier County Judge Seward Stokley Jolley, who served from 1935 until 1959.

References 

Road bridges in Florida
Bridges completed in 1969
Concrete bridges in Florida
Buildings and structures in Naples, Florida
Transportation buildings and structures in Collier County, Florida